This is a list of alleged sightings of unidentified flying objects or UFOs in Italy.

100 BC 

 Iulius Obsequens reports: When C. Murius and L. Valerius were consuls, in Tarquinia towards sunset, a round object, like a globe, a round or circular shield, took its path in the sky from west to east.

91 BC 

 Iulius Obsequens reports: At Aenariae, while Livius Troso was promulgating the laws at the beginning of the Italian war, at sunrise, there came a terrific noise in the sky, and a globe of fire appeared burning in the north. In the territory of Spoletum, a globe of fire, of golden color, fell to the earth gyrating. It then seemed to increase in size, rose from the earth and ascended into the sky, where it obscured the sun with its brilliance. It revolved toward the eastern quadrant of the sky.

42 BC 

 Iulius Obsequens reports: something like a sort of weapon, or missile, rose with a great noise from the earth and soared into the sky.

1933 
 In 2000, Roberto Pinotti published material regarding the so-called "Fascist UFO Files", which dealt with a flying saucer that had crashed near Milan in 1933 (some 14 years before the Roswell, New Mexico crash), and of the subsequent investigation by a never mentioned before Cabinet RS/33, that allegedly was authorized by Benito Mussolini, and headed by the Nobel scientist Guglielmo Marconi. A spaceship was allegedly stored in the hangars of the  SIAI Marchetti in Vergiate near Milan.

1942
 Large object with four red lights seen in March in Turin.

1950
 A factory worker who was working near Varese sighted three humanoids near a craft. One of the entities saw him and shot him with a beam, although it did not do any harm to the man. Afterwards, the humanoids went into the craft and started up to the sky.

1954
A UFO sighting in Florence, October 28, 1954, followed by a fall of angel hair.

1973
In 1973, an Alitalia airplane left Rome for Naples sighted a mysterious round object. Two Italian Air Force planes from Ciampino confirmed the sighting. In the same year there was another sighting at Caselle airport near Turin.

1978
 Two young hikers while walking on Monte Musinè near Torino saw a bright light; one of them temporarily disappeared and after a while was found in a state of shock and with a noticeable scald on one leg. After regaining consciousness he reported having seen an elongated vehicle and that some strangely shaped beings descended from it. Both the young hikers suffered from conjunctivitis for some time.
A close encounter reported in September 1978 in Torrita di Siena in the Province of Siena. A young motorist saw in front of him a bright object, two beings of small stature who wore suits and helmets, the two approached the car, and after watching it carefully went back and rose again to the UFO. A boy who lived with his family in a country house not far from there said he had seen at the same time "a kind of small reddish sun".
Yet in 1978, there has been also the story of Pier Fortunato Zanfretta, the best known and most controversial case of an Italian alleged alien abduction. Zanfretta said to have been kidnapped on the night of 6 December and 7 December while he was performing his job at Marzano, in the municipality of Torriglia in the Province of Genoa.

See also 
 List of major UFO sightings

References

External links 
 UFO Chronology 1939-1946
 MUFON - Last 20 UFO Sightings and Pictures

Italy
Historical events in Italy